Punk (stylized in all caps) is the second studio album by Japanese band Chai. The album was released on February 13, 2019, by Otemoyan Records. It was released on March 15, 2019, in North America and Europe by Burger Records and Heavenly Recordings, respectively.

Composition
AllMusic's Tim Sendra felt the record left some of the rap rock influences prominent on PINK behind in exchange for more pop-oriented stylings. Indeed, PUNK dives into several pop-based genres from bubblegum to indie to synth-pop.

Kicking off the record is "Choose Go!", a "punchy" piece of "cheerleader rock", that features "synths that churn like vacuum cleaners." Following is "the pulsing electronic pop" of "Great Job".
"Wintime" is "Paramore-plucked, rose-tinted tropic-pop".

"This is CHAI", the record's only song to have its writing credited to all four members, has been called everything from post-punk to Europop to "happily corny handbag house". "Fashionista", along with "This is CHAI", "has some seriously infectious funk woven into its DNA". "Curly Adventure" is a "synth-pop ballad" that "throw[s] heavy metal guitar grind" into its mix.

Accolades

Tracks

Accompanying music video
In 2019, a music video for the eighth track (Curly Adventure) was directed by Sean Solomon, using character designs from band member and visual director Yuuki, in which the video picks a load of eccentric (and surreal)scenes with vibrant colours with the simplistic style of the album's cover, inspired by Peanuts characters and the hyper-stylized Hanna-Barbera cartoons of the 1970s.
The additional credits in the video are storyboards drawn by Evan Red Borja and animation by Sarah Schmidt and Ian Ballantyne.

Track listing
All music by Mana and Kana, except where noted. All lyrics by Yuuki, except where noted.

Personnel
Chai
 Kana - vocals, guitar
 Mana - vocals, keyboards
 Yuuki - bass guitar, chorus
 Yuna - drums, chorus

Charts

In Popular Culture

A song from the album, "This is Chai," was prominently featured in an episode of the American television series Better Call Saul in 2020.

References

2019 albums
Chai (band) albums
Heavenly Recordings albums